State Road 63 (NM 63) is a state highway in the US state of New Mexico. NM 63's northern terminus is a continuation as Cabana Trail in Cowles, and the southern terminus is at Interstate 25 (I-25), U.S. Route 84 (US 84) and US 85 in Rowe.

Major intersections

See also

 List of state roads in New Mexico

References

External links

063
Transportation in San Miguel County, New Mexico
063